Maphumulo Local Municipality is an administrative area in the iLembe District of KwaZulu-Natal in South Africa. Maphumulo is an isiZulu name meaning "place of rest".

The municipality is predominantly rural, comprising mostly tribal land, which is administered by the Ingonyama Trust on behalf of local communities. Sugar-cane cultivation is the predominant economic activity and land use in the municipality. Subsistence agricultural activities in the form of small cropping areas attached to traditional family units dominate land usage.

The only major town in the municipality is Maphumulo.

Main places
The 2001 census divided the municipality into the following main places:

Politics 

The municipal council consists of twenty-three members elected by mixed-member proportional representation. Twelve councillors are elected by first-past-the-post voting in twelve wards, while the remaining eleven are chosen from party lists so that the total number of party representatives is proportional to the number of votes received. 

In the election of 1 November 2021 the African National Congress (ANC) lost its majority, obtaining a plurality of eleven seats on the council.
The following table shows the results of the election.

References

External links
 Official website

Local municipalities of the iLembe District Municipality
Maphumulo Local Municipality